Viktor Grigoryevich Savchenko (born 2 September 1948) is a retired Ukrainian hurdler. He competed in the 400 m event at the 1972 Summer Olympics, but failed to reach the final.

References

1948 births
Living people
Athletes (track and field) at the 1972 Summer Olympics
Olympic athletes of the Soviet Union
Soviet male hurdlers
Ukrainian male hurdlers